Aichryson × aizoides, youth-and-old-age, is a hybrid species of flowering plant in the family Crassulaceae, native to the Canary Islands. Its parents are Aichryson tortuosum × Aichryson punctatum. A succulent, its 'Variegatum' cultivar has gained the Royal Horticultural Society's Award of Garden Merit as a houseplant.

References

aizoides
Interspecific plant hybrids
House plants
Endemic flora of the Canary Islands
Plants described in 1993